Jianpeng Ma from the Baylor College of Medicine, was awarded the status of Fellow in the American Physical Society, after they were nominated by their Division of Biological Physics in 2007, for outstanding contributions to the field of biophysics are in developing novel computational methods that have substantially expanded one's ability to simulate, model and refine flexible biomolecular systems based on experimental data at low to intermediate resolutions. He is one of the pioneers and leading experts in the field.

References 

Fellows of the American Physical Society
American Physical Society
American physicists
Living people
Date of death missing
Year of birth missing (living people)